Adelfas will be a station of line 2 of the Seville Metro. It will be located in the intersection of Ciencias Av. and Adelfas St., in the neighborhood of Seville Este. Adelfas will be an underground building situated between the stations of Ciencias and Aeronáutica on the same line. Construction works will begin in late 2011, and the station is expected to be operational during 2017.

Future services

See also
 List of Seville metro stations

References

External links 
  Official site.
  Map of Line 2 project
 History, construction details and maps.

Seville Metro stations
Railway stations in Spain opened in 2017